Robert Brett Westbrook (born September 6, 1950 in Austin, Minnesota) is an American historian, and Joseph F. Cunningham Professor of History at the University of Rochester.

Life
Westbrook graduated from Yale University in 1972, summa cum laude, Phi Beta Kappa, and with exceptional distinction in history. He received his PhD from Stanford University in 1981. Westbrook has taught at Scripps College, and Yale University. His first book, a reformulation and expansion of his thesis, John Dewey and American Democracy, is considered the best intellectual biography of the influential pragmatist philosopher. Westbrook has been described by Cheryl Misak as "our best intellectual historian of pragmatism."[2][1]

Personal life
Westbrook is married to Shamra Westbrook.

Awards
1993 Merle Curti Award

Works
 "An Innocent Abroad? John Dewey and International Politics", Ethics & International Affairs, Volume 7 (1993)
 
 Why We Fought: Forging American Obligations in World War II, June 2004, HarperCollins, 
  (reprint Cornell University Press, 1993)

Editor

References

External links
CV

People from Austin, Minnesota
Yale College alumni
Stanford University alumni
Scripps College faculty
Yale University faculty
University of Rochester faculty
Living people
1950 births
21st-century American historians
21st-century American male writers
Historians from Minnesota
Historians from California
American male non-fiction writers